Hyun Song Shin is a South Korean economic theorist and financial economist who focuses on global games. He has been the Economic Adviser and Head of Research of the Bank for International Settlements (BIS) since May 1, 2014.

Previously, he was the Hughes-Rogers Professor of Economics at Princeton University since 2006, though he took a leave in December 2009 to advise South Korean President Lee Myung-bak on the international economy as well as help set the agenda for the G-20 Seoul summit in November 2010.

Education and career 
Shin obtained a B.A. in philosophy, politics and economics at Oxford University (Magdalen College) in 1985, an MPhil in economics from Oxford's Nuffield College in 1987, and a DPhil in economics from Oxford's Nuffield College in 1988. Shin became a research fellow in 1988 and tutorial fellow in 1990 at Magdalen College, Oxford.

In 1994 he moved to the University of Southampton, where he became a professor of economics. He moved back to Oxford in 1996 as a university lecturer in economics and faculty fellow in economics at Nuffield College. In 2000 he became a professor of finance at the London School of Economics. In 2006 he moved to Princeton University.

In addition to his academic positions, Shin served as an advisor to Bank of England (2000–2005) and is a member of the Financial Advisory Roundtable at the Federal Reserve Bank of New York and a panel member of the U.S. Monetary Policy Forum since 2007. He is a research fellow of the Centre for Economic Policy Research since 1998. Shin was the chairman of the editorial board of the Review of Economic Studies from 1999 to 2003. He collaborated with Isabel Schnabel, comparing the Bankruptcy of Lehman Brothers with the bankruptcy of Leendert Pieter de Neufville in 1763.

Shin was elected a Fellow of the Econometric Society and of the European Economic Association in 2004, and a Fellow of the British Academy in 2005. He was awarded the R. K. Cho Economics Prize in 2009.

In December 2009, Shin was named chief advisor to President Lee Myung-bak on international finance. He played a major role in formulating South Korea's macroprudential policy and helped develop the agenda for the G-20 during Korea's presidency, which culminated in the 2010 G-20 Seoul summit on November 11–12, 2010.

In September 2013 the Basel, Switzerland–based Bank for International Settlements (BIS) announced that Shin would begin a five-year term as its Economic Adviser and Head of Research starting in May 2014. In that role he would also serve as a member of the BIS Executive Committee.

Research contribution 
Global coordination games belong to a subfield of game theory that gained momentum in 1998 when he published an article with Stephen Morris. Shin and Morris considered a stylized currency crises model, in which traders observe the relevant fundamentals with small noise, and show that this leads to the selection of a unique equilibrium. This result is in stark contrast with models of complete information, which feature multiple equilibria.

In 2011 he won the second Financial Times annual essay contest on banking regulation sponsored by the International Centre for Financial Regulation. He wrote about how the G-20 major economies could increase financial stability with macroprudential regulations that "leans against the credit cycle" using examples from the UK, South Korea, and the United States. Specifically, he "advocated a global tax on non-core banking liabilities as the best way to deflate bubbles".

Shin argues that "financial firms systematically take more risk as asset prices rise", which means that the financial system's vulnerability "cannot be measured by price indicators like credit spreads or volatility. Instead, analysts should focus on quantities like the amount of assets on intermediary balance sheets and the liquidity and maturity mismatches between those assets and the liabilities used to fund them".

Risk and Liquidity 
He is known for this 2010 book Risk and Liquidity which opens with a quote from an anonymous risk manager who says: "The value added of good risk management is that you can take more risks". He then says that financial risk is endogenous, due to the thinking expressed in this quote and makes an analogy with London's Millennium Bridge in which the instability was also endogenous. When the bridge lurched to the side, everyone adjusted their footing at exactly the same time, to avoid falling over, and this caused a synchronized oscillation.

The Taper Tantrum 
Martin Wolf credits him with coming up with the explanation for the huge global overreaction (called the "taper tantrum") to United States Federal Reserve chair Ben Bernanke's hint that he might taper quantitative easing in May 2013. Shin presented this theory at a conference on Asia at the Federal Reserve Bank of San Francisco in December 2013. Shin suggested that it was caused by the growth of demand for the private-sector bonds of emerging economies, and the resulting excess global liquidity.

Sources
 Stephen Morris and Hyun Song Shin (1998), "Unique Equilibrium in a Model of Self-Fulfilling Currency Attacks", American Economic Review, 88 (3): 587–97.

Citations

South Korean economists
New classical economists
Academics of the London School of Economics
Princeton University faculty
Fellows of the Econometric Society
1959 births
Living people
Alumni of Magdalen College, Oxford
Alumni of Nuffield College, Oxford
Fellows of Magdalen College, Oxford
Academics of the University of Southampton
Fellows of Nuffield College, Oxford
Fellows of the British Academy